State Route 345 (SR 345), also known as Cedar Fork Road, is an  north–south state highway in Claiborne County, Tennessee. It serves as a connector between Tazewell to SR 63 and the Hopewell community.

Route description

SR 345 begins in Tazewell at an intersection with US 25E/SR 32 just north of downtown. It goes northeast to pass through neighborhoods before passing by businesses and industrial areas. The highway then leaves Tazewell and continues northeast for several miles through a mix of farmland and wooded areas, running parallel to the Powell River. SR 345 then comes to an end at an intersection with SR 63, just across the river from Hopewell. The entire route SR 345 is a two-lane highway.

Major intersections

References

345
Transportation in Claiborne County, Tennessee